Singhanwala is a village  from Moga, Punjab, India. Its population is about 15,000. Gurdev Singh Sidhu served for 25 years as a village head. Sardar Nachatter Singh Gill served for 10 years. Since 2003 Balvir Singh is the sarpanch, the village head.

Education
The village does not have a 10+2 school. Many parents cannot afford to send their teenagers to the nearby city and the generation is not able to get good education. Private schools like Genius School and Kalangidhar School also do not have facilities to teach higher classes. Only parents with higher income can provide good education to their kids.

Sikhism
There are three Gurdwaras  in the village, Bhai Mohar Singh, Bhai Seva Singh, Gurudwara Sahib in Chand Patti (Area) and Gurudwara Sangeet Vidiyala. Bhai Mohar Singh youth club, Ekta Welfare Youth Club, Baba Jiwan Singh Club, Ma Chintpurni Club and Shaheed Bhagat Singh youth club. There are five clubs in the village.

References 

Villages in Moga district